Inner City Blues is the debut studio album by saxophonist Grover Washington Jr.  It was recorded at the Van Gelder Studio in September 1971 and released in 1972 via Kudu Records label.

Background
The title track was a cover of the recent hit by Marvin Gaye released in June 1971. The album also includes a cover of Bill Withers' hit "Ain't No Sunshine", released shortly before recording this album. In 2008, it was reissued on CD by Verve Records.

Reception
Thom Jurek of AllMusic stated "This is an amazing debut in so many ways, and it was followed by a run of albums for the label through the end of the '70s when Washington left for Elektra. Inner City Blues remains standing today as a landmark and a turning point in jazz".

Track listing 
 "Inner City Blues" (Marvin Gaye, James Nyx Jr.) – 7:10
 "Georgia on My Mind" (Hoagy Carmichael, Stuart Gorrell) – 4:38
 "Mercy Mercy Me (The Ecology)" (Gaye) – 5:07
 "Ain't No Sunshine" (Bill Withers)/"Theme from Man and Boy" (AKA "Better Days") (J.J. Johnson) – 8:32
 "Until It's Time for You to Go" (Buffy Saint-Marie) – 4:35
 "I Loves You Porgy" (George Gershwin, Ira Gershwin, DuBose Heyward) – 5:05

Personnel 
 Grover Washington Jr. – alto saxophone, tenor saxophone
 Bob James – electric piano, arrangements and conductor
 Richard Tee – organ
 Eric Gale – guitars
 Ron Carter – basses
 Idris Muhammad – drums
 Airto Moreira – percussion
 Donald Ashworth – baritone saxophone
 Wayne Andre – trombone
 Thad Jones – trumpet, French horn
 Eugene Young – trumpet, flugelhorn
 Hilda Harris – vocals 
 Marilyn Jackson – vocals 
 Maeretha Stewart – vocals 
 Tasha Thomas – vocals

String Section
 Maurice Brown, Charles McCracken, Alan Shulman and Anthony Sophos – cello 
 Julius Brand, Paul Gershman, Julius Held, Leo Kahn, Harry Katzman, Raoul Poliakin, Max Pollikoff and Paul Winter – violin

Production 
 Creed Taylor – producer
 Rudy Van Gelder – engineer 
 Bob Ciano – album design 
 Steve Salmieri – photography

References

1972 debut albums
Grover Washington Jr. albums
Albums produced by Creed Taylor
Kudu Records albums
Albums recorded at Van Gelder Studio